Jalwali is a village in Bikaner district in the Indian state of Rajasthan. It is near the Indo-Pakistani border.

References

Villages in Bikaner district